Castelsardo is a town and comune in Sardinia, Italy, located in the northwest of the island within the Province of Sassari, at the east end of the Gulf of Asinara.

History
Archaeological excavations have showed the human presence in the area of Castelsardo since pre-Nuragic and Nuragic times, as well as during the Roman domination in Sardinia.

After the fall of the Western Roman Empire, the monastery  of Nostra Signora di Tergu was founded nearby, but the current town originates from the castle built here, in 1102 (or 1270), by the Doria family of Genoa. The castle and the village which gradually formed round it where the seat of the Doria's fiefdom in the island called Castel Doria or Castelgenovese, until it was conquered by the Aragonese in the 15th century (1448), and named Castillo Aragonés (Castel Aragonese). Except for the Maddalena archipelago, it was the last city in the island to join the Kingdom of Sardinia.

Castelsardo, was part of the Savoy's Kingdom of Sardinia, obtained by will of King Charles Emmanuel III.

Main sights
 Elephant's Rock, one of the symbols of Sardinia
 Megalithic walls, from pre-Nuragic times
 Nuraghe Paddaju and others
 Doria Castle (1102)
 Co-Cathedral, entitled to St. Anthony the Abbot. The crypts house the Museum  "Maestro di Castelsardo";
 Church of St. Mary, with a wooden Black Christ
 Doria Palace
 La Loggia Palace, town hall since 1111
 Palace of Eleonora of Arborea
 Sea walls

References

  CATHOLIC ENCYCLOPEDIA: Ampurias

Hilltowns in Sardinia
Cities and towns in Sardinia
Territories of the Republic of Genoa